Séptimo Día - No Descansaré (stylized as Sép7imo Día) was a touring arena show by Cirque du Soleil, inspired by the music of Argentinian band Soda Stereo.

Acts
 Skipping ropes
 Aerial revolver
 Hand balancing
 Arms and legs ballet
 Hair hang
 TV Overdose
 Diabolo
 Russian cradle
 Sand painting
 Water tank
 Aerial chains and grill
 Campfire
 Suspended pole
 Power track and banquine

Music
The music for the show was produced and mixed by the two surviving members of the band Soda Stereo, Zeta Bosio and Charly Alberti, and was co-produced by Adrián Taverna, who created new versions and mash-ups of the songs especially for the show.

The following tracks are from the official album (and live show soundtrack) and feature remixes and mashups of the band's songs:

 En El Séptimo Día (Prologue)
 Cae el Sol / Planta (Opening Celebration)
 Picnic en el 4to B / Te Hacen Falta Vitaminas / Mi Novia Tiene Bíceps (Skipping Ropes)
 Ella Usó, Un Misil (Character Transition)
 Prófugos (Aerial Revolver)
 En Remolinos (Handbalancing on Canes)
 Crema de Estrellas (Arms and Legs Ballet)
 Cuando Pase el Temblor (Transition)
 Luna Roja (Hair Hang)
 Fue (Transition)
 Sobredosis de TV (TV Overdose)
 Planeador (with samples from Disco Eterno) / Persiana Americana (Diabolo)
 Signos (Russian Cradle Wheel)
 Un Millón de Años Luz (Sand Painting)
 Hombre al Agua (Water Tank)
 En La Ciudad de la Furia (Aerial Grill and Chains)
 Crema de estrellas / Te Para Tres (Campfire)
 Primavera Cero (Suspended Pole)
 Sueles dejarme sólo (instrumental) / Corazón Delator (Fast Track Setup)
 De Música Ligera (with samples from X-Playo) (Fast Track and Banquine)
 Terapia de amor intensiva (Finale)

Tour
Séptimo Día unusually began its arena tour in Argentina (instead of in Montreal, where Cirque du Soleil's touring shows usually premiere), as it was the country of origin of the band Soda Stereo, on which the show's concept was based.

References

External links
Official site
"Exclusive: Cirque Du Soleil Teases Soda Stereo Spectacular"

Cirque du Soleil touring shows